Aghcheh Darband (also Romanized as Āghcheh Darband; also known as Āqjeh Darband) is a village in Owch Tappeh-ye Sharqi Rural District, in the Central District of Meyaneh County, East Azerbaijan Province, Iran. At the 2006 census, its population was 64, in 11 families.

References 

Populated places in Meyaneh County